Bankside Pier is a stop for river services in London. It is located on the south bank of the river Thames, close to Tate Modern museum.

Three services call at the pier: the river bus routes RB1 (between Embankment and Woolwich Arsenal) and RB2 (from here to St George Wharf Pier and Millbank Pier for the Tate Britain). The third service is the Circular Cruise Westminster which goes to Westminster via St Katherine's.

Other public transport nearby

 Southwark Underground station (Jubilee line)
 Blackfriars Underground station (Circle and District lines) - on the north side of the Thames

Services

External links

 Bankside Pier Transport for London

London River Services
Infrastructure in London
Transport in the London Borough of Southwark
Piers in London